Balaji S. Srinivasan (born May 24, 1980) is an American entrepreneur and investor. He was the co-founder of Counsyl, the former Chief Technology Officer (CTO) of Coinbase, and former general partner at the venture capital firm Andreessen Horowitz.

Early life and education 
Srinivasan grew up on Long Island, in Plainview, New York. He received BS, MS, and PhD degrees in Electrical Engineering from Stanford University and an MS in Chemical Engineering, also from Stanford.

Career

Counsyl 
In 2007, Srinivasan co-founded genetic testing company Counsyl, which provided tests to prospective parents to screen for Mendelian diseases. Counsyl was acquired by Myriad Genetics for $375 million in 2018.

Andreessen Horowitz 
In 2013, Srinivasan joined the venture capital firm Andreessen Horowitz as a general partner.

21 Inc (later Earn.com) 
In 2013, Srinivasan co-founded 21e6, which later became 21 Inc, a Bitcoin mining startup that failed as a bitcoin mining business after raising over $120 million from investors. The company later pivoted to become Earn.com, which allowed senders to pay users in digital currency to reply to emails. Earn.com was acquired by digital currency exchange company Coinbase in April 2018. After Coinbase purchased Earn.com, it became Coinbase Earn and Srinivasan became Coinbase’s first CTO. He left the company in 2019. Coinbase shut down Coinbase Earn in December 2019.

Teleport 
In April 2014, he co-founded Teleport, a job search engine. Teleport was acquired by Topia in 2017.

Published books

The Network State 
In July 2022, Srinivasan published The Network State: How To Start a New Country which coined the concept of a Network State which proposes the setting up of decentralized digital communities that crowdfund resources to build new autonomous cities and states. The ideas in the book are inspired by the work of the economist Albert O. Hirschman who sees two basic paths to reform - voice (remake the system from within) and exit (leave and build something new).

Public profile 

MIT Technology Review named Srinivasan on its list of "Innovators Under 35" in 2013. In 2018, Fortune ranked him 26th on its "The Ledger 40 Under 40" list.

In 2013, Srinivasan gave a talk at Y Combinator's Startup School titled "Silicon Valley's Ultimate Exit" and published "Software Is Reorganizing the World" in Wired, which advocated for the technology industry to digitally exit the United States and move abroad. The talk was received positively by Reason, Wired, and Bloomberg News, but was criticized by The New York Times and The Wall Street Journal. In 2022, Srinivasan extended this idea, publishing The Network State, about online nationality and the breakaway from geographical governments.

In 2013, after TechCrunch published an article exploring links between Silicon Valley tech leaders and the Dark Enlightenment movement that mentioned this speech, Srinivasan suggested doxing reporters who bring these links to the attention of the public. In an email to Curtis Yarvin, he wrote, "If things get hot, it may be interesting to sic the Dark Enlightenment audience on a single vulnerable hostile reporter to dox them and turn them inside out with hostile reporting sent to *their* advertisers/friends/contacts.”

In 2017, the Trump Administration considered appointing Srinivasan as FDA Commissioner. While being considered for the appointment, Srinivasan deleted all of his tweets, including tweets critical of the FDA. In one such deleted tweet, Srinivasan wrote, "For every thalidomide, many dead from slowed approvals.”

In July 2020, Srinivasan drew attention after criticizing Taylor Lorenz's reporting alleged misbehavior of Away's CEO on Twitter. On the Twitter thread, he suggested Lorenz and journalists like her are "sociopaths." Lorenz defended herself and characterized Srinivasan's previous actions as harassment on Clubhouse and other platforms.

In April 2021, Srinivasan donated $50,000 in cryptocurrency to aid in Indian COVID-19 relief in during a resurgence of the virus in the country. On Twitter, he pledged to donate another $50 for every time his post was retweeted, up to $100,000.

Personal life 
In 2020 Srinivasan moved to Singapore.

References

External links 
 Balaji Srinivasan on Twitter
 The Network State book online

Chief technology officers
Angel investors
People associated with Bitcoin
Living people
American people of Indian descent
Year of birth uncertain
20th-century births
People from Plainview, New York
1980 births